Federico Taborda (born 1 November 1988) is a professional Argentine footballer who currently plays as a goalkeeper.

Club career

FK Senica
Taborda made his professional Fortuna Liga debut for Senica against Spartak Trnava on July 21, 2018, in a 1:0 home victory, after an own-goal by a member of broader Slovak national team, Matúš Čonka .

Honours
FC U Craiova 1948
Liga II: 2020–21

References

External links
 FK Senica official club profile 
 
 Futbalnet profile 
 

1988 births
Living people
People from Pergamino
Argentine footballers
Association football goalkeepers
Civitanovese Calcio players
Slovak Super Liga players
FK Senica players
Liga II players
FC U Craiova 1948 players
Argentine expatriate footballers
Argentine expatriate sportspeople in Italy
Expatriate footballers in Italy
Argentine expatriate sportspeople in Slovakia
Expatriate footballers in Slovakia
Argentine expatriate sportspeople in Romania
Expatriate footballers in Romania
Sportspeople from Buenos Aires Province